Bryosartor is a genus of bryozoan described by Gordon and Braga in 1994. The only species is Bryosartor sutilis. It belongs to the family Catenicellidae. No subspecies are listed. It is a marine bryozoan known from New Caledonia.

References 

Cheilostomatida
Fauna of the Pacific Ocean
Taxa described in 1994
Monotypic bryozoan genera